Byron Township is one of twenty-four townships in Ogle County, Illinois, USA.  As of the 2010 census, its population was 6,563 and it contained 2,594 housing units.

Geography
It contains the north three-quarters of the city of Byron.

Cemeteries
The township contains these two cemeteries: Byron City and Saint Mary's.

Demographics

School districts
 Byron Community Unit School District 226

Political districts
 Illinois's 16th congressional district
 State House District 89
 State Senate District 45

References
 
 United States Census Bureau 2009 TIGER/Line Shapefiles
 United States National Atlas

External links
 City-Data.com
 Illinois State Archives
 Township Officials of Illinois

Townships in Ogle County, Illinois
Populated places established in 1849
Rockford metropolitan area, Illinois
Townships in Illinois
1849 establishments in Illinois